Balacra monotonia is a moth of the  family Erebidae. It was described by Strand in 1912. It is found in Angola, Cameroon, the Republic of Congo and Equatorial Guinea.

References

Balacra
Moths described in 1912
Erebid moths of Africa